Ptychoglene is a genus of moths in the subfamily Arctiinae. The genus was erected by Felder in 1874.

Species
Ptychoglene pertunda Druce, 1889
Ptychoglene xylophila Druce, 1885
Ptychoglene sanguineola  (Boisduval, 1870)
Ptychoglene aequalis (Walker, 1854)
Ptychoglene phrada Druce, 1889
Ptychoglene erythrophora Felder, 1874
Ptychoglene coccinea (H. Edwards, 1886)
Ptychoglene rubromarginata Druce, 1885

References

Cisthenina
Moth genera